Hawe is a surname. Notable people with the surname include:

 Dick Hawe (1883–1961), English footballer
 Sarah Hawe (born 1987), Australian rower
 Steven Hawe (born 1980), Northern Irish footballer

See also
Hawes (surname)

English-language surnames